This index of kite articles (excluding persons whose name is "Kite" with exceptions for noteworthy flight connections); excluding articles on birds called "kites" for which see Kite (bird).  Excluded also are works of literature, film, and non-flight art, non-tethered airplane names, and articles on non-aeronautical kiting like in gaming, programming, or money. What is included are aeronautical kite system topics.

Topics included below specially affect the kite's wing, kite's essential tether, kite's mooring, uses of kites, kite applications, and kite control systems. Events and people that have noteworthy impact on the world of aeronautical kites are included. Science and engineering articles that highly impact the kite world are included. Paravane (water kite) articles are included.


A
 Arc kite
 Airborne wind turbine

B
 Bali Kite Festival
 Ballooning (spider), or kiting
 Bermuda kite
 Bow kite
 Bowed kite
 Box kite

C
 :Category:Kite festivals

D
 Domina Jalbert

F
 Fighter kite
 Foil kite
 Francis Melvin Rogallo

H
 Hang gliding
 High altitude wind power

I
 Indoor kite
 Inflatable single-line kite

K
 Kite
 Kite aerial photography
 Kite applications
 Kite boarding
 Kite buggy
 Kite control systems
 Kite-Eating Tree
 Kite landboarding
 Kite line
 Kite mooring
 Kite running
 Kite skating
 Kite skiing
 Kitesurfing
 Kite types
 Kites on Ice, festival

L
 Leading edge inflatable kite
 Let's Go Fly A Kite, song

M
 Malay kite
 Manja (kite)
 Man-lifting kite

P
 Paravane (water kite)
 Peter Powell (kite)
 Power kite

S
 Sled kite
 Smithsonian Kite Festival
 Soft single skin kite
 Sport kite

T
 Tetrahedral kite

Kite